MKS may refer to:

 MKS (Switzerland), a broker of precious metals
 MKS Inc., a software vendor (formerly Mortice Kern Systems)
 MKS Instruments, an American process control instrumentation company
 MKS system of units of measurement based on the metre, kilogram, and second
M. K. Stalin, an Indian politician and current Chief Minister of Tamil Nadu
 Lincoln MKS, an automobile produced by the Lincoln division of Ford Motor Company
 Marks & Spencer, stock symbol MKS
 McKusick–Kaufman syndrome, a rare human genetic condition
 Moscow Korean School, a Korean international school in Moscow, Russia
 Mutya Keisha Siobhan, an English girl group
 Międzyzakładowy Komitet Strajkowy or Inter-Enterprise Strike Committee, formed in Gdańsk Shipyard, Poland in 1980
 .mks, a file extension for the Matroska open standard free container format